Anomura (sometimes Anomala) is a group of decapod crustaceans, including hermit crabs and others. Although the names of many anomurans include the word crab, all true crabs are in the sister group to the Anomura, the Brachyura (the two groups together form the clade Meiura).

Description
The name Anomura derives from an old classification in which reptant decapods were divided into Macrura (long-tailed), Brachyura (short-tailed) and Anomura (differently-tailed). The alternative name Anomala reflects the unusual variety of forms in this group; whereas all crabs share some obvious similarities, the various groups of anomurans are quite dissimilar.

The group has been moulded by several instances of carcinisation – the development of a crab-like body form. Thus, the king crabs (Lithodidae), porcelain crabs (Porcellanidae) and hairy stone crab (Lomisidae) are all separate instances of carcinisation.

As decapods (meaning ten-legged), anomurans have ten pereiopods, but the last pair of these is reduced in size, and often hidden inside the gill chamber (under the carapace) to be used for cleaning the gills. Since this arrangement is very rare in true crabs (for example, the small family Hexapodidae), a "crab" with only eight visible pereiopods is generally an anomuran.

Evolution
The infraorder Anomura belongs to the group Reptantia, which consists of the walking/crawling decapods (lobsters and crabs).  There is wide acceptance from morphological and molecular data that Anomura and Brachyura (true crabs) are sister taxa, together making up the clade Meiura.  The cladogram below shows Anomura's placement within the larger order Decapoda, from analysis by Wolfe et al. (2019).

Some of the internal relationships within Anomura can be shown in the cladogram below, which shows Hippidae as sister to Paguroidea, and resolves Parapaguridae outside of Paguroidea:

Classification
The infraorder Anomura contained seven extant superfamilies:

The oldest fossil attributed to Anomura is Platykotta, from the Norian–Rhaetian (Late Triassic) Period in the United Arab Emirates.

References

External links

 
Arthropod infraorders
Norian first appearances
Extant Late Triassic first appearances